Lepturobosca virens is a species of beetles in the longhorn beetle family, that can be found in Europe and Russia.

Description
Both sexes are of the same colour, but the size may vary. Females are slightly larger than males (14–22 mm). The species colour is dark green, with striped antennae. The body is hairy.

Habitat
The host plants are coniferous and deciduous trees.

References

Lepturinae
Beetles described in 1758
Taxa named by Carl Linnaeus